Lilong Chajing (Imphal West) is a town and a municipality in Imphal West district in the Indian state of Manipur.

Demographics
 India census, Lilong (Imphal West) had a population of 10,417. Males constitute 49% of the population and females 51%. Lilong (Imphal West) has an average literacy rate of 72%, higher than the national average of 59.5%: male literacy is 81%, and female literacy is 63%. In Lilong (Imphal West), 12% of the population is under 6 years of age.

References

Cities and towns in Imphal West district